Pau (also: Paubach) is a small river of Aachen, North Rhine-Westphalia, Germany. It flows into the Wurm.

See also
List of rivers of North Rhine-Westphalia

Rivers of North Rhine-Westphalia
Rivers of Germany